The Syracuse Orange football team represents Syracuse University in the sport of American football. The Orange compete in the Football Bowl Subdivision (FBS) of the National Collegiate Athletic Association (NCAA) and the Atlantic Division of the Atlantic Coast Conference (ACC). Syracuse is the only FBS school in New York to compete in one of the Power Five conferences.

The Orange play their home games in the JMA Wireless Dome, referred to as the JMA Dome on the university's campus in Syracuse, New York. The stadium is also known as "The Loud House".

Formed in 1889, the program has over 700 wins and has achieved 1 consensus Division I Football National Championship, winning the championship game over the Texas Longhorns in the 1960 Cotton Bowl Classic, for the 1959 season. Syracuse has had 2 undefeated seasons, 5 conference championships since 1991, and has produced a Heisman Trophy winner, over 60 first team All-Americans, 18 Academic All-Americans and over 240 NFL players. Syracuse has had 18 members inducted into the College Football Hall of Fame, 2nd-most in the ACC, including former players Ernie Davis, Tim Green, Don McPherson, Art Monk and former coaches Vic Hanson, Ben Schwartzwalder, and Dick MacPherson. The Orange boast 8 inductees in the Pro Football Hall Of Fame, tied for the 4th-most of any school, including Jim Brown, Marvin Harrison, Larry Csonka, and Floyd Little.

The Orange have 27 bowl appearances, 10 of which are among the New Year's Six Bowls. Syracuse has finished in the Final Top 25 rankings 21 times in the national polls, and finished in either the AP or Coaches Polls a combined 35 times since 1952. Syracuse has appeared in over 200 AP Polls including 7 weeks at AP number one.

History

Early history (1889–1948)
Syracuse played its first football game on November 23, 1889, and achieved its first success in the 1890s and 1900s. With the construction of "state-of-the-art" Archbold Stadium in 1907, Syracuse rose to national prominence under College Football Hall of Fame coach Frank "Buck" O'Neill. The 1915 squad garnered a Rose Bowl invitation that the school declined, having already played on the West Coast that season. In 1918, John Barsha (born Abraham Barshofsky) was co‐captain of the 1918 Walter Camp All‐America football team.

The 1920s had continued success with teams featuring two-time All American Doc Alexander and star end Vic Hanson. Vic Hanson was an American football player and coach, basketball player, and baseball player. A three-sport college athlete, he played football, basketball, and baseball at Syracuse in the 1920s, serving as team captain in all three sports. The Watertown, New York native was named a Basketball All-American three times—in 1925, 1926, and 1927—was named the Helms Foundation College Basketball Player of the Year and was a consensus selection to both 1925 and 1926 College Football All-America Teams. Hanson is one of only two individuals who are members (Amos Alonzo Stagg being the other) of both the Basketball Hall of Fame and the College Football Hall of Fame and the only one inducted into the Basketball Hall of Fame, the College Basketball Hall of Fame and the College Football Hall of Fame. He later coached the team from 1930 to 1936.

In the 1930s, Syracuse and nearby Cornell University were among the first collegiate football teams to include African-American players as starting backfield players. Wilmeth Sidat-Singh was an African-American basketball star player for DeWitt Clinton High School. He received an offer of a basketball scholarship from Syracuse University and enrolled in 1935. While playing an intramural football game, an assistant football coach noticed his talent and asked him to join the football team. Sidat-Singh starred for Syracuse, playing a position equivalent to modern-day quarterback. In that era, when games were played in Southern segregation states, African-American players from Northern schools were banned from the field. Because of his light complexion and name, Sidat-Singh was sometimes assumed to be a "Hindu" (as people from India were often called by Americans during this time). However. shortly before a game against Maryland, a black sportswriter, Sam Lacy wrote an article in the Baltimore Afro-American, revealing Sidat-Singh's true racial identity. Wilmeth Sidat-Singh was held out of the game and Syracuse lost that game 0–13. Olympic track athlete Marty Glickman, who played football for Syracuse, believed athletic director Lew Andreas was a bigot who occasionally used a disparaging term for Blacks; the 18-year-old Glickman thought Andreas should have stood up for Sidat-Singh (Glickman also faulted himself for not standing up for Sidat-Singh).<ref>Glickman, Marty. (1996). The Fastest Kid on the Block: The Marty Glickman Story. Syracuse: University of Syacuse Press.</ref>  In a rematch the following year at Syracuse, Sidat-Singh led the Orange to a lopsided victory (53–0) over Maryland. In 2005, Syracuse University honored Wilmeth Sidat-Singh by retiring his basketball jersey number. On Saturday, Nov. 9, 2013, the University of Maryland publicly apologized to surviving relatives from the Webb family at a ceremony during a football game with Syracuse University.

Ossie Solem coached at Syracuse from 1937 to 1945. During his tenure at Syracuse, he tutored a young assistant coach named Bud Wilkinson, who went on to lead the Oklahoma Sooners to win three national championships.

Ben Schwartzwalder era (1949–1973)

The late 1930s and 1940s had a decline in fortunes that began to reverse when Ben Schwartzwalder took over as head coach in 1949. Syracuse made its first bowl appearance in the 1953 Orange Bowl, followed by appearances in the 1957 Cotton Bowl and the 1959 Orange Bowl. Jim Brown (a high school standout from Manhasset, New York), considered to be one of the greatest running backs of all time, as well as one of the greatest players in NFL history, was a consensus first-team All-American in 1956, finished fifth in the Heisman Trophy voting and set school records for highest season rush average (6.2) and most rushing touchdowns in a single game (6). In the Cotton Bowl, he rushed for 132 yards, scored three touchdowns, and kicked three extra points, but a blocked extra point after Syracuse's third touchdown was the difference as TCU won 28–27. 

In 1959, Syracuse earned its first consensus national championship (finishing No. 1 in both the AP and Coaches' Polls) following an undefeated season (11–0) and Cotton Bowl Classic victory over Texas. The team featured sophomore running back Ernie Davis (of Elmira, New York), who went on to become the first African American to win the Heisman Trophy in 1961, and All-American tackle Ron Luciano, who eventually become a prominent Major League Baseball umpire. Davis was slated to play for the Cleveland Browns in the same backfield as Jim Brown, but died of leukemia before being able to play professionally. Syracuse remained competitive through the 1960s with a series of All-American running backs, including Floyd Little and Larry Csonka (both inductees in the Pro Football Hall of Fame).

Schwartzwalder produced 22 straight years of non-losing football, took the Orange to seven bowls, won the Lambert-Meadowlands Trophy (to recognize the best team in the Northeastern region in Division I FBS) four times, and won the national championship in 1959. He developed some of the most impressive running backs the game has ever seen - Jim Brown, Ernie Davis, Jim Nance, Floyd Little and Larry Csonka. Orange teams outrushed opponents by more than 22,000 yards under Schwartzwalder. He retired as Syracuse's head coach after the 1973 season, which was Syracuse's third consecutive losing season. Schwartzwalder left Syracuse with a 153–91–3 record.

In 1969, a group of nine African American student-athletes boycotted Syracuse University's football program to demand change and promote racial equality. Popularized erroneously in 1970 by the media as the “Syracuse 8,” the nine students behind the boycott were Gregory Allen, Richard Bulls, Dana Harrell, John Godbolt, John Lobon, Clarence “Bucky” McGill, A. Alif Muhammad (then known as Al Newton), Duane Walker, and Ron Womack. The student athletes drafted a list of four demands, three of which were advocating for the betterment for all student athletes at the university, were access to the same academic tutoring as their white teammates; better medical care for all team members; starting assignments based on merit; and racially integrating the coaching staff, which had been all white since 1898.

Frank Maloney era (1974–1980)
Michigan assistant coach Frank Maloney was hired as Schwartzwalder's replacement. Maloney's tenure at Syracuse was marked by inconsistency. The fan base turned on him as the Orange failed to achieve the national status they had enjoyed under Schwartzwalder. Maloney's program was also limited by archaic facilities. Archbold Stadium, Syracuse's home field since 1907, was in need of replacement. Nonetheless, Maloney did recruit a number of future NFL stars such as Joe Morris and Pro Football Hall of Fame member Art Monk.

Maloney was the subject of criticism, not only from the fans and alumni, but also from the 1959 national championship team, members of which started a campaign calling for his ouster. Ironically enough, this call from program alumni came during the 1979 season, Maloney's best at Syracuse, when the Orangemen qualified for the Independence Bowl, beating McNeese State. After coaching the Orangemen for seven seasons and presiding over the opening of a new stadium, the Carrier Dome (renamed in 2022 the JMA Wireless Dome), in 1980, Maloney resigned.

Dick MacPherson era (1981–1990)
Dick MacPherson was hired as the head coach in 1981 and after several mediocre seasons, fans wanted MacPherson fired, coining the phrase, "Sack Mac".

However, the fans' opinion of Coach MacPherson changed when the program returned suddenly to national prominence in 1987 with an undefeated 11–0 regular season record. The team featured Maxwell Award-winning quarterback Don McPherson and fullback Daryl Johnston. The team missed an opportunity to play for the NCAA Division I-A national football championship, because both Oklahoma and Miami also finished undefeated that year and finished higher in the polls. Instead, the team faced Southeastern Conference champion Auburn University in the Sugar Bowl. The game ended in a 16–16 tie when Auburn kicked a late field goal rather than trying for a game-winning touchdown. MacPherson left Syracuse after the 1990 season to accept the position of head coach for the NFL's New England Patriots.

McPherson is credited with building a strong recruiting pipeline in the northeast area.

Paul Pasqualoni era (1991–2004)
Syracuse continued to experience success under MacPherson's successor, Paul Pasqualoni, previously the team's linebackers coach, appearing in 11 bowl games (including three major bowls) and winning 9. The team also captured or shared three Big East football championships during this period.

Prominent players of the period included Donovan McNabb, Marvin Harrison, Dwight Freeney, Keith Bulluck, Rob Moore, Donovin Darius, Qadry Ismail, Kevin Johnson, Rob Konrad, Tebucky Jones, and Marvin Graves. Rivalries shifted in the early 1990s as Penn State ended its series with Syracuse and joined the Big Ten. Syracuse, meanwhile, joined the newly formed Big East football conference with traditional rival West Virginia University, and national power Miami. In 2004, Miami and Virginia Tech left the Big East to join the Atlantic Coast Conference, followed by Boston College in 2005, threatening the stature of the Big East. Syracuse was originally invited to leave the Big East and join the ACC, but under pressure from the Governor of Virginia, the ACC decided to invite Virginia Tech to join the conference, instead. Thus, Syracuse remained in the Big East. Syracuse's streak of winning seasons ended in 2002 when they went 4–8. This was followed by consecutive 6–6 seasons. Although they won a share of the Big East title in 2004 and competed in the Champs Sports Bowl, the teams from 2002 to 2004 were considered mediocre by Syracuse standards. This prompted new athletic director Dr. Daryl Gross to fire Pasqualoni after 14 years at the helm.

Greg Robinson era (2005–2008)

In 2005, the university hired Greg Robinson, defensive coordinator for Texas, as head coach. Robinson installed a new West Coast offense scheme, replacing the option run style of offense previously run by Pasqualoni, and new defensive schemes.

The 2005 season started on a high note as Syracuse nearly upset eventual Big East and Sugar Bowl champion West Virginia, forcing five turnovers in the 15–7 loss. They followed it up with a 31–0 thrashing of Buffalo and another near-upset, this time against #25 Virginia, falling 27–24 on a last-second field goal. The squad lost its final eight games of the season. Syracuse finished the year 1–10, the worst on-field season in school history and won only 10 games with Robinson running the program. Robinson's Orange improved to 4–8 in 2006 but fell to 2–10 in 2007. The 2007 season included a road upset of number-18 Louisville. When the struggles continued in 2008, Syracuse fired Robinson following a 3–9 season where the high point was a 24–23 upset of Notre Dame. At the other end of the spectrum, in a game that exemplified the Robinson era, the Orange lost 55–13 to Penn State. Robinson's .213 winning percentage on the field is the worst for a non-interim coach in school history. He has been criticized for abandoning the traditional northeast recruiting pipeline.

In 2015, Syracuse vacated all of its wins from 2005 and 2006 due to ineligible players, dropping Robinson's "official" winning percentage to .119.

Doug Marrone era (2009–2012)

On December 12, 2008, Doug Marrone, a Bronx, New York native and former Orange player, was announced as the replacement for Robinson as head coach. Marrone was the first Syracuse alumnus to serve as head football coach since Reaves H. Baysinger in 1948. Reportedly, alumni such as Tim Green and Floyd Little wanted Marrone from the moment the previous coach Greg Robinson was fired, and when interviewed by Green, Marrone was found to have kept a folder of current high-school players in the Syracuse area to get a head start in recruiting.

Improvement throughout the program was noticed immediately, as the Orange, despite only a marginal improvement in their win–loss record, going 4–8 under Marrone for his first year, played many much more closely, including a 28–7 loss at number-seven Penn State. In 2010, the Orange finished the regular season with a winning record for the first time since the 2001 season at 7–5, including road wins against number-19 West Virginia and two-time defending conference champion Cincinnati. The team earned its first bowl bid since 2004 and along with second-ranked Oregon and 10th-ranked Boise State, the five road wins were the best in 2010 of all FBS teams. December 30, 2010, Syracuse defeated Kansas State in the inaugural Pinstripe Bowl at Yankee Stadium. The game was televised live on ESPN. Two years later, the Orange defeated West Virginia in the 2012 Pinstripe Bowl. On January 7, 2013, Marrone left Syracuse, accepting the head-coaching position of the NFL's Buffalo Bills.

Scott Shafer era (2013–2015)
The day after Marrone's departure, Syracuse promoted defensive coordinator Scott Shafer to head coach. Coach Shafer's first season was marked by inconsistency from the team in spite of the bowl eligibility for the third time in four years. Syracuse capped off the season with a 21–17 victory over Minnesota in the 2013 Texas Bowl to finish the year 7–6. The first season for the Orange in the ACC was 2013. The 2014 season brought about a noticeable drop in quality. Syracuse finished the season a disappointing 3–9. In 2015, after they started the season 3–0, the Orange collapsed, losing 8 of their final 9 games to finish the season 4–8, and on November 23, 2015, it was announced that Shafer would be fired after the last game of the 2015 campaign.

Dino Babers era (2016–present)

After an extensive coaching search, Syracuse announced the hiring of Bowling Green head coach Dino Babers as the new Orange head football coach. Babers is the first African-American head coach in school history. Babers brought with him an exciting, up-tempo offense he employed both as a head coach and as an assistant coach.

In Babers' first season in charge, Syracuse started the year at 4–4, with the highlight of the first eight games being a 31–17 upset of number-17 Virginia Tech at home. Syracuse kept the momentum from the upset going and beat rival Boston College on the road, 28–20. However, they were blown out 54–0 in their next game by No. 3 Clemson. In the final game of the season, Syracuse lost to ACC rival Pittsburgh by a score of 76–61. The game was the highest scoring in FBS history with a combined score of 137. Syracuse finished 4–8 for the second consecutive year. In 2017, the Orange started 4–3, including a win over No. 2 Clemson, but they lost their final five games to finish 4–8 for the third straight year.

 Conference affiliations 
Syracuse has been independent and affiliated with two conferences.

 Independent (1889–1990)
 Big East Conference (1991–2012)
 Atlantic Coast Conference (2013–present)

 Championships 

 National championships 
Syracuse finished their undefeated 1959 season with a 23–14 victory over the No. 4 Texas Longhorns in the Cotton Bowl, and were named the national champions by all major selectors (including the major wire-service: AP and Coaches' Poll).

 Eastern and Conference championships 
For much of its history, Syracuse played as an independent, as did the majority of what are now labeled as Division I FBS football-playing schools located in the Northeast and Mid-Atlantic regions. During this time, Eastern Championships were named by independent third-party selectors and awarded of various trophies. The process of picking an Eastern Champion eventually came to be symbolized by the Lambert-Meadowlands Trophy awarded by the New Jersey Sports and Exposition Authority beginning in 1936. As a result, the Lambert-Meadowlands Trophy, voted on by a panel of sports writers in New York, became the de facto conference championship for those schools. 

In 1991, the majority of football independents in the East (including Syracuse) aligned themselves together in the Big East Football Conference. The Big East first crowned an official champion in 1993. In 2013, Syracuse joined the Atlantic Coast Conference (ACC).

† Co-champions

 Head coaches 

There have been 30 head coaches at Syracuse. Dino Babers became the most recent head coach in 2016.

 Traditions and legacy 

 Legend of 44 
The No. 44 at Syracuse is one of the most legendary numbers ever associated with a college football program. Like tailbacks at USC or quarterbacks at Purdue, the running back position at Syracuse has a rich tradition of greatness. Much of that greatness has revolved around one jersey number — 44.

Syracuse University officially retired #44 on Saturday, November 12, 2005. Since 1954, 11 players have worn the number and three of the most famous #44s — Jim Brown, Ernie Davis, and Floyd Little — are in the College Football Hall of Fame.

 "The Greatest" 

Jim Brown played at SU from 1954 to 1956. Brown earned numerous honors as Orange playing college football, basketball, track and field and lacrosse. In his senior year in 1956 Brown was a consensus first-team All-American and led the team to a Cotton Bowl. He finished 5th in the Heisman Trophy voting and set school records for highest season rush average (6.2), most rushing touchdowns in a single game (6), and an NCAA single-game record of 43 points. After his successful college career, Brown went on to become one of the greatest football players of all time.

Jim Brown was an All Pro and a Pro Bowl invitee every season he was in the league, was recognized as the AP NFL Most Valuable Player three times, and won an NFL championship with the Browns in 1964. He led the league in rushing yards in eight out of his nine seasons, and by the time he retired, he had shattered most major rushing records. Brown's memorable professional career led to his induction into the Pro Football Hall of Fame in 1971. His football accomplishments at Syracuse garnered him a berth in the College Football Hall of Fame. Jim Brown also earned a spot in the Lacrosse Hall of Fame, giving him a rare triple crown of sorts. Today, he is recognized as the greatest football player ever by most professional football writers.

But Brown's legacy goes beyond sports. Brown was one of the NFL's earliest social issues activists along with a group of top African American athletes from different sporting disciplines such as Bill Russell, Muhammad Ali and Kareem Abdul Jabbar. In the 1960s, Brown co-founded the Black Economic Union to support the growth of black-owned businesses. In the 1980s he also started the Amer-I-Can program which mentors youth in both inner cities and prisons.

 "The Elmira Express" 
Ernie Davis, the only Orange player to win the Heisman Trophy, played at Syracuse from 1959 to 1961, and went on to national fame in each of those three seasons, winning first-team All-American honors twice. Davis led the 1959 Syracuse team to a national championship, capping an 11–0 season with a 23–14 win over the Texas Longhorns in the 1960 Cotton Bowl Classic, where Davis was named Most Valuable Player. That same season, Elmira Star-Gazette sports writer Al Mallette coined the nickname for Davis, the "Elmira Express".

During his Cotton Bowl visit to host city Dallas, Texas, Ernie and his black teammates found discrimination prevalent in the American South. Author Jocelyn Selim writes that at the banquet following the 1960 game, Davis was told he could only accept his award and then would be required to leave the segregated facility when the doors were opened to the public for a dance.

Despite the racial issues, Davis became the first black athlete to be awarded the Heisman Trophy (the highest individual honor in collegiate football) and he also won the Walter Camp Memorial Trophy following his 1961 season at Syracuse University. President John F. Kennedy had followed Davis' career and requested to meet him while he was in New York to receive the trophy. Later in 1963, when Elmira chose February 3 to celebrate Davis' achievements, Kennedy sent a telegram, reading:Seldom has an athlete been more deserving of such a tribute. Your high standards of performance on the field and off the field, reflect the finest qualities of competition, sportsmanship and citizenship. The nation has bestowed upon you its highest awards for your athletic achievements. It's a privilege for me to address you tonight as an outstanding American, and as a worthy example of our youth. I salute you.Davis was the number-one pick in the 1962 NFL Draft. He was bound to go to the Cleveland Browns where he would be teammates with Jim Brown. Davis signed a three-year contract with the Browns in late December 1961.It was the most lucrative contract for an NFL rookie up to that time.
However, Davis' dream of pairing with Jim Brown took a tragic turn when Davis was diagnosed with leukemia. The disease was incurable and Davis died at age 23 at Cleveland Lakeside Hospital on May 18, 1963. Following his death, the Browns retired his number 45 jersey.

A motion picture biography, The Express: The Ernie Davis Story, directed by Gary Fleder and based on the non-fiction book The Elmira Express: the Story of Ernie Davis by Robert C. Gallagher, began production in April 2007 and was released on October 10, 2008.

His commemorative statue now stands in front of the school named in his honor, Ernie Davis Academy. Another statue of Davis stands on the campus of Syracuse University, near the steps of Hendricks Chapel and the Shaw Quad where pre-game pep rallies are held. He was inducted to the College Football Hall of Fame in the fall of 1979.

 "The Franchise" 

Floyd Little played for Syracuse from 1964 to 1966. He is the only three-time All-American running back to compete for the Syracuse University Orangemen. He finished 5th in Heisman Trophy voting in both 1965 and 1966. Floyd was the leading force behind teams that earned tickets to the Sugar Bowl in 1964 and the Gator Bowl in 1966 (teaming with another great tailback Larry Csonka in the latter). In addition to breaking the running records of Brown and Davis, Little became the greatest kick returner in Orange history. He led the country in all-purpose yardage, averaging 199 yards per game in 1965.
Floyd Little was the first ever first-round draft pick to sign with the American Football League's Denver Broncos. During his rookie year, Little led the NFL in punt returns with a 16.9-yard average. He led the NFL in combined yards in 1967 and 1968 and was the first ever Bronco to win a rushing title, leading the AFC in rushing in 1970 and the following year he became the first Bronco to eclipse 1,000 yards, gaining 1,133 to lead the NFL. Little was Denver Broncos team captain all 9 seasons, including his rookie season and he was known as "The Franchise". Floyd Little retired as the NFL's 7th all-time leading rusher with 6,323 yards. He later was inducted both in the College and Pro Football Hall of Fame. To honor his achievements Denver Broncos retired his #44 jersey.

Statues of Davis (second on campus), Brown and Little are at Syracuse University's Plaza 44, commemorating the number the running backs wore while playing football. No. 44 has become so associated with Syracuse that the university's ZIP code, 13244, was requested by university officials to remember those who wore 44 for the Orange. “Number 44 not only has come to represent greatness on the football field, it has become a part of the university's and the community's identity”.

 Pride of the Orange 

The Syracuse University Marching Band (SUMB), also known as the "Pride of the Orange", is the collegiate marching band of Syracuse University. The SUMB performs at all home football games throughout the season, and also makes several local parades and other performances throughout the year. It is one of the largest student organizations at Syracuse University, consisting of approximately 200 members. Founded in 1901, it is one of the oldest collegiate bands in the nation. Over the course of almost 120 years, the "Pride of the Orange" has played a huge role in University history and has been a constant source of pride for the University.

 'Cuse on the Quad Starting three hours prior to Syracuse football home games, fans attend the social meeting, children's playground, food and beverages garden areas organized by the University located directly on the Quad, the center of the campus. Fans can watch College Game Day or the top college football games streaming live on ESPN under the tents. Fans can also take in the sights and sounds of local DJs, live music, and the Syracuse University Marching Band which performs on the steps of Hendrick's Chapel about an hour before kickoff.
 Down the Field The band has first officially performed at a football game in 1925. Over the decades, after every touchdown scored by the Orange, the SUMB plays the Syracuse University fight song, "Down the Field" (1914), written by Ralph Murphy, Class of 1916, and composed by C. Harold Lewis, Class of 1915. Win or lose, the Alma Mater is played by the band after every football game. The team will gather in the end zone with the cheerleaders and Otto and sing the song. Students and fans often wrap their arms around the shoulders of those standing next to them and sway side to side.
 Flip the Banner at Varsity Varsity, a pizza shop just outside the campus, has been passed down for three generations since 1926. The Varsity has been an integral part of SU sports culture for decades. The Orange schedule is displayed with banners hanging on the walls of the restaurant. After victories, the "Pride of the Orange" goes to Varsity and will play their sets inside the restaurant. After the band plays, the banner of the opposing team will be flipped upside down to symbolize the victory. For the entire season, the banners will tell the tale of Syracuse's season.

 Rivalries 

Boston College

The two schools first met on October 18, 1924, a 10–0 win for the Syracuse Orange. The Eagles and the Orange began playing an annual game in 1961. To date, Boston College and Syracuse have played each other 46 times. Aside from Holy Cross, no team has played Boston College more than Syracuse. In 2004, the Eagles' last year in the Big East, the Orange pulled off a surprising upset that kept the Eagles from going to their first BCS game. BC's departure from the Big East put the future of the rivalry in doubt. Syracuse's admission into the ACC in 2013 resurrected the rivalry, with the two teams playing each another annually as members of the ACC's Atlantic Division.

Syracuse leads the series 31–20 through the 2018 season.

Pittsburgh

The rivalry with fellow ACC conference member Pittsburgh began in 1916, and has been played annually since 1955. The Panthers and Orange were both Eastern football independents for most of their history but have shared the same football conference since 1991 when the Big East Football Conference was formed from Eastern football independents. Pitt is tied as the most played opponent for Syracuse and Syracuse is the third most played opponent for Pitt. Sharing membership in the Atlantic Coast Conference (ACC) since 2013, the Panthers and Orange have played a total of 74 times. Pittsburgh leads the series 39–31–3 through the 2018 season.

West Virginia

Syracuse and West Virginia have played 60 times. Often, these games have had a bearing on which collegiate program was the best in the East. In much of the '80s and '90s, Syracuse and West Virginia made for one of the Big East's best head-to-head match-ups on a yearly basis. West Virginia then left the Big East for the Big 12 Conference in 2012.

The Ben Schwartzwalder Trophy goes to the winner of the West Virginia and Syracuse football game. The trophy was introduced in 1993 and is named after former WVU football player and Syracuse head coach Ben Schwartzwalder, who had died in March of that year. The trophy weighs 55 pounds and was sculpted by Syracuse player Jim Ridlon.

West Virginia won the first trophy game at Syracuse and has gone on to win 11. Syracuse has won the trophy eight times and currently holds it. Syracuse leads the series 34–27 with the last two games played in 2012 Pinstripe Bowl and 2018 Camping World Bowl. Syracuse is currently on the 4 game winning streak.

Penn State

The "heyday" of the Syracuse Penn State rivalry took place during the 1950s and 1960s when the teams battled back and forth in a competitive and often controversial string of contests. Syracuse football was led by legendary coach Ben Schwartzwalder, and Penn State by Rip Engle from 1950 to 1966 and Joe Paterno from 1967 to 2011. From 1950 to 1970, Syracuse won 11 to Penn State's 10 games. Unfortunately conference realignment and scheduling disagreements have dampened the intensity of the rivalry between the teams in recent years.

The teams first met on October 28, 1922 at the New York Polo Grounds battling to a scoreless tie kick-starting an East coast rivalry that has seen 71 total match-ups with the teams meeting almost every season from 1922 to 1990. The only exception was during the 1943 season, when Syracuse did not field team in light of World War II.  From 1922 to 1940 Syracuse held a 10-4-4 advantage over the Nittany Lions, before Penn State would win 8 straight from 1941 to 1949. In the 1947 match-up, Penn State prevailed 40–0 in State College behind a staunch defense that held the Orange to (-47) total yards which is an NCAA record. (-107 rushing, 60 passing, in 49 plays) From 1956 to 1966 the Orange regained command winning 8 out of 11. Since 1967, the Nittany Lions have dominated winning 24 of 27 match-ups including 16 straight from 1971 to 1986. In 1987, Dick MacPherson coached Syracuse to a 48–21 victory over the Nittany Lions in the JMA Wireless Dome. Syracuse won again the following year at Penn State, but lost the final two games before the suspension of the series in 1991.

Penn State leads the all-time series 43–23–5, and have won 5 straight. The most recent match-up was played at Metlife Stadium in East Rutherford, NJ; a 23–17 win for Penn State.

The teams do not have any future match-ups scheduled.

Colgate

For many years, Syracuse's main football rivals were the nearby Colgate Red Raiders.  Colgate and Syracuse first played each other in football in 1891, with Colgate recording a 22–16 victory. The Red Raiders would go on the win 12 of the first 16 games in the series. Colgate's early dominance in the series quickly gave rise to the legend of the Hoodoo (a play on a corruption of the word Voodoo).  The schools have played each other a total of 67 times, with the series tied at 31-31-5.

By the late 1950s, Syracuse had established itself as a major power in Eastern college football, and the games became increasingly one-sided. Following the 1961 contest, Colgate terminated the series, in order to focus on playing smaller, peer institutions.

Following the NCAA's I-A/I-AA split in 1978, the rivalry was intermittently renewed in the 1980s, with Syracuse comfortably winning all three games played in the decade.  In 2010, the rivalry was renewed again after a 23-year absence, with Syracuse recording a 42–7 victory. The series resumed again in 2016, when Syracuse hosted Colgate in a game played in the JMA Wireless Dome, which Syracuse won 33–7.

 Uniforms 

Syracuse University adopted orange color as its official color in 1890. The color was selected after a vote by students, alumni, faculty, and trustees, who noted it was a strong, bright color not claimed by any other school. Syracuse University was the first school to adopt only one primary color. It was chosen to "represent the golden apples of Hesperia, as well as the story of the sunrise and hope for a golden future."

The first uniforms of the Orange were classic white sweaters and dark pants. Syracuse football wore these from 1889 to 1919. Orange color was first worn in the 1920s. A blue number was stitched on the back of orange jerseys, and the dark pants were replaced with Khaki moleskin. Blue began to be generally recognized as a secondary color of Syracuse.

During its glory years beginning with the first bowl game appearance in 1952, Syracuse football used to wear white jerseys and orange pants at home at Archbold stadium. From 1952 to 1966, coach Ben Schwartzwalder, with his military background and always looking for an edge, thought white jerseys made his players look bigger, faster and stronger. During his first three seasons (1949–51) and in 1958, he also experimented with an all orange look to camouflage the football. Blue jerseys were rarely seen during that era as Syracuse wore them only three times.

The switch to blue and orange combination at home came in 1967. Since then, it was blue jersey and orange pants at home until the first three Frank Maloney seasons (1974–76) when the newly assigned coach wanted to move away from the Schwartzwalder era with orange jerseys and unusually designed white helmets, before bringing blue jerseys and orange helmets back for essentially the next 28 seasons. Syracuse started wearing white jerseys and orange jerseys (and pants) at home again in the 2000s. Three colors (orange, white and blue) have been used in several combinations throughout the years.

 Bowl games 

Since the establishment of the team in 1890, Syracuse has appeared in 27 bowl games. Included in these games are 10 combined appearances in the "New Year's Six" bowl games (the Rose, Sugar, Cotton, Orange, Fiesta and Peach) and 1 Bowl Championship Series (BCS) game appearances. The New Year's Six represent six of the ten oldest bowl games played at the FBS level (missing the Sun, Gator, Citrus and Liberty bowls), continuing their original history of putting the very best teams in the country against each other.

Syracuse's all-time bowl record is 16 wins, 10 losses and 1 tie (16–10–1).

 National polls 
Syracuse has finished in the Final Top 25 rankings 21 times in the national polls, and finished in either the AP or Coaches Polls a combined 35 times since 1952. Syracuse has appeared in over 200 AP Polls including 7 weeks at AP No.1.

† AP Poll began selecting the nation's Top 20 teams in 1936. Only the Top 10 teams were recognized from 1962 to 1967. The AP Poll expanded back to the Top 20 teams in 1968. In 1989, it began recognizing the Top 25 teams.‡ UPI/Coaches Poll began selecting its Top 20 teams on a weekly basis in 1950 before expanding to the nations's Top 25 teams in 1990. Individual award winners 

 Retired numbers 

Syracuse University retired six jersey numbers and hung them in the JMA Wireless Dome rafters.

Notes

 The 150 greatest players in college football's 150-year history 
Jim Brown is named as the greatest player in college football history. ESPN unveiled college football's 150 greatest players of the first 150 years of history of college football. ESPN's top 150 players were determined by a blue-ribbon panel of current and former writers, broadcasters, administrators, sports information directors and ESPN personalities.

 Heisman Trophy voting 
 

 National award winners 

† Finalist National coaching awards 

 Consensus All-Americans 

Syracuse football players have earned All-America honors over 130 times since 1908. Among those selections, 20 have achieved Consensus All-American status. Of those consensus All-Americans, 9 are unanimous selections. Below is the list of first team All Americans named by major selectors.

 Eastern College Athletic Conference (ECAC) awards 

 Big East Conference awards 

 Big East Football 10th Anniversary honors 
The best players of the decade and the team, which includes 29 players, was selected by Big East media members to celebrate the 10th year of Big East football.

 Atlantic Coast Conference awards 

† co-winner ACC All-Conference selections 
Syracuse football players in All-ACC teams since 2013.

 Hall of Fame 

College Football Hall of Fame
Syracuse is one of the most represented schools in the National Football Foundation's College Hall of Fame. The Orange have 18 enshrinees, second-most among ACC programs behind Pittsburgh (25).'' Syracuse has had 11 players and 7 former coaches inducted into the Hall of Fame.

Pro Football Hall of Fame

Syracuse's legacy in the Pro Football Hall of Fame ranks among the finest of any college football program. The Orange boast eight inductees, tied for the eight-most of any school. Only Notre Dame (13), USC (13), Michigan (11), Ohio State (10), Miami (9), and Pittsburgh (9) have more representatives in the Pro Football Hall of Fame than Syracuse.

Orange in the National Football League

NFL All-Time Team

The National Football League 100th Anniversary All-Time Team was revealed in 2019 after being voted on by a panel consisting of media members, former players and league personnel. It honored the best players of the first 100 years of the National Football League (NFL). The team was chosen by a panel of 26 voters made up of coaches, team and front office executives, former players and members of the media between April and June 2018. Players were selected at each position group, and were voted in no order. There will be 10 quarterbacks, 12 running backs, 10 wide receivers, 5 tight ends, 7 tackles, 7 guards, 4 centers, 7 defensive ends, 7 defensive tackles, 6 outside linebackers, 6 middle/inside linebackers, 7 cornerbacks, 6 safeties, 2 kickers, 2 punters, 2 kick/punt returners, and 10 coaches.
Sources:

Bold Unanimous selection.

NFL All-Decade Teams

NFL Individual Awards

All-Pro and Pro Bowls

Facilities

Archbold Stadium 

Upon its completion in 1907, Archbold Stadium was touted as the "Greatest Athletic Arena in America." Designed to resemble the Roman Coliseum and to never become outdated, Archbold Stadium was a trademark of Syracuse Orange football. The stadium was named for John D. Archbold, who donated $600,000 for the project. The Orange battled for victory inside the walls of Archbold Stadium from 1907 until 1978. Orange fans of the early 1900s were astonished by Archbold's unique design. The stadium's front entrance defined the character of Archbold, which consisted of an impressive cement arch and two epic towers, which extended high above the archway.

In addition to providing the University and the fans with an aesthetically beautiful stadium, Archbold gave the Orange football team a distinct home field advantage for all 71 years of its existence. The Orange went 265-112-20 all-time at Archbold, and at times were nearly unbeatable. From 1915 to 1927, Syracuse achieved a remarkable home record of 61-10-6. Then, during the 11-year stretch from 1958 to 1968, the team in Orange won 47 and lost only 6 games played at Archbold Stadium.

Toward the end of the 1970s, Syracuse University was under pressure to improve its football facilities in order to remain a Division I-A football school. Archbold Stadium could not be expanded; earlier in the decade it had been reduced from 40,000 seats to 26,000 due to fire codes. Therefore, Syracuse University decided to build a new stadium on the site of Archbold, which, appropriately for Syracuse's often cold weather, was to have a domed Teflon-coated, fiberglass inflatable roof. While the JMA Wireless Dome was being built during the 1979 season, Syracuse played "home" games at three different locations—Giants Stadium, home of the NFL's New York Giants; Rich Stadium (now known as New Era Field), home of the NFL's Buffalo Bills; and Schoellkopf Field, home of the Cornell Big Red.

The JMA Wireless Dome 

The Syracuse Orange football team plays their games at the JMA Wireless Dome, referred to as the JMA Dome. The stadium is also known as "The Loud House", when it opened in September 1980, it was made clear just how loud it was inside; soon famous nickname was coined. It is the largest domed stadium of any college campus and the largest domed stadium in the Northeastern United States. The JMA Wireless Dome is used for several sports at the university and seats 49,250 for football.  The field was dedicated in 2009 to Ernie Davis, the first African American Heisman Trophy winner. The field now reads "Ernie Davis Legends Field" between the 45 yard lines on the home side.  Davis's number forty-four was also placed along that yard line.  The dedication took place at the Syracuse vs. West Virginia game October 10, 2009.

In May 2018, the university announced the first phase of a major renovation to the JMA Wireless Dome as the central portion of a larger campus update. The most significant changes were the replacement of the current air-supported roof with a fixed roof, two-thirds of which will be translucent, the installation of air conditioning and the largest centerhung videoboard in college sports. The upgrade also included a new lighting and sound systems, Wi-Fi improvements, accessibility upgrades, improved restrooms, and new concession spaces. The high-profile renovation project by Geiger Engineers - the same firm that was the structural engineer for the original stadium, was named a winner of NCSEA's 2021 Excellence in Structural Engineering Award for Forensic/Renovation/Retrofit/Rehabilitation Structures.

The school announced the next phase of its work to enhance, elevate and expand the stadium experience in April, 2022. This includes a complete replacement of benches with individual seats; a construction of a new publicly accessible event facility adjacent to the Dome; and an upgrade of the entire digital infrastructure, including latest 5G technology and wireless connectivity. The renovation of both phases, estimated to cost $165 million, is expected to be completed in 2024.

Future scheduled opponents 

Announced schedules as of February 7, 2020.

References

External links

 

 
American football teams established in 1889
1889 establishments in New York (state)